Moisie may refer to:

 Moisie River, Quebec
 Moisie, Quebec a village at the mouth of the Moisie river
 Zec de la Rivière-Moisie, a zone d'exploitation contrôlée (controlled harvesting zone) (zec)